The 2023 Oeiras Indoors was a professional tennis tournament played on hard courts. It was the 1st edition of the tournament which was part of the 2023 ATP Challenger Tour. It took place in Oeiras, Portugal from 2 to 8 January 2023.

Singles main-draw entrants

Seeds

 1 Rankings are as of 26 December 2022.

Other entrants
The following players received wildcards into the singles main draw:
  Jaime Faria
  Gonçalo Oliveira
  Pedro Sousa

The following players received entry from the qualifying draw:
  Joris De Loore
  Kenny de Schepper
  Cem İlkel
  Alibek Kachmazov
  Mark Lajal
  Dino Prižmić

The following player received entry as a lucky loser:
  Edan Leshem

Champions

Singles

 Joris De Loore def.  Filip Cristian Jianu 6–3, 6–2.

Doubles

 Victor Vlad Cornea /  Petr Nouza def.  Jonathan Eysseric /  Pierre-Hugues Herbert 6–3, 7–6(7–3).

References

2023 ATP Challenger Tour
2023 in Portuguese sport
January 2023 sports events in Portugal